Picket Twenty, once a hamlet, is now effectively a suburb of Andover, in the Test Valley district of Hampshire, England. The centre of  Andover lies to the (2.6 km) north-west of the suburb.

History 
On the 1888 OS map, only the farmstead of "Picket Twenty Farm" is drawn, although "Pavey's Farm" is relatively nearby"

Just thirteen dwellings are listed for Picket Twenty in the 1962 Kelly's Directory of Andover, it appears this number remained constant until 2008.

Construction began in 2010 for 1,200 new homes on agricultural land near to the hamlet. By September 2019 1158 homes were occupied.

After 2017 in a further phase of development, housing was built  beneath Andover Down, and relatively close to Harewood forest.

Although an expansion of Andover, the Picket Twenty development is detached from the urban area, with a large sports ground providing a natural barrier. Picket Twenty can therefore be considered a suburb of Andover.

Both the barn and granary at Picket Twenty Farm are grade two listed.

References

External links
Picket Twenty Website(expired domain checked 10 Nov 2019)

Villages in Hampshire
Test Valley